Narin is a village south of Pivka in the Inner Carniola region of Slovenia.

The local church, built northwest of the settlement, is dedicated to Saint James and belongs to the Parish of Šmihel.

References

External links

Narin on Geopedia

Populated places in the Municipality of Pivka